Podolin  is a village in the administrative district of Gmina Wapno, within Wągrowiec County, Greater Poland Voivodeship, in west-central Poland.

The village is first mentioned in an 1136 bull of Innocent II. Information about its history is also contained in the Liber beneficiorum of the Archbishop of Gniezno.

References

Podolin